Herry Susilo (born 3 October 1988) is an Indonesian professional footballer who plays as a full-back for Liga 2 club Kalteng Putra, on loan from Liga 1 club Dewa United.

Club career

Persijap Jepara
In 2020, Herry signed a contract with Indonesian Liga 2 club Persijap Jepara. This season was suspended on 27 March 2020 due to the COVID-19 pandemic. The season was abandoned and was declared void on 20 January 2021.

Dewa United
In 2021, Herry signed a contract with Indonesian Liga 2 club Dewa United. He made his league debut on 28 September against RANS Cilegon at the Gelora Bung Karno Madya Stadium, Jakarta.

Honours

Club 
Dewa United
 Liga 2 third place (play-offs): 2021

References

External links

1988 births
Association football defenders
Living people
Indonesian footballers
PSIS Semarang players
Persiba Balikpapan players
Persipur Purwodadi players
Kalteng Putra F.C. players
PSIM Yogyakarta players
Persijap Jepara players
Indonesian Premier Division players
Liga 1 (Indonesia) players
Liga 2 (Indonesia) players
People from Grobogan Regency
Sportspeople from Central Java
Dewa United F.C. players